The Neponset Reservoir is a reservoir located in Foxborough, Massachusetts that is the headwater of the Neponset River that runs to Boston Harbor. The reservoir dates from the mid-1800s, and was originally used by mills downstream for water power.

References

19th-century establishments in Massachusetts
Buildings and structures in Norfolk County, Massachusetts
Foxborough, Massachusetts
Lakes of Norfolk County, Massachusetts
Protected areas of Norfolk County, Massachusetts
Reservoirs in Massachusetts